William Opoku Mensah (born 3 January 1996) is a Ghanaian professional footballer who plays as a forward for Mukura Victory.

Club career
Opoku Mensah played for Sekondi Eleven Wise at youth level, prior to beginning his senior career with Karela United in 2015. He featured in the club's promotion-winning campaign of 2017 from Division One to the Ghanaian Premier League. In 2017, Opoku Mensah had a trial with K3 League team FC Uijeongbu. He made his professional debut in the 2018 Ghanaian Premier League for Karela United against Medeama on 17 March, which preceded his first goal versus Eleven Wonders a week later. On 6 March 2019, Opoku Mensah joined USL Championship side Swope Park Rangers. He was released on 22 November 2019.

In January 2020, Opoku Mensah returned to Ghana with reigning Premier League champions Asante Kotoko. He netted on debut against Liberty Professionals on 2 February.

International career
William Opoku Mensah has previously represented the Ghana B,Black Stars B team at international level.

Scored 2 goals for Ghana B in 5 friendly matches.

Career statistics
.

References

External links
William Opoku Mensah on WorldFootball.com

1996 births
Living people
People from Sekondi-Takoradi
Ghanaian footballers
Association football forwards
Ghanaian expatriate footballers
Expatriate soccer players in the United States
Ghanaian expatriate sportspeople in the United States
Ghana Premier League players
Karela United FC players
Sporting Kansas City II players
Asante Kotoko S.C. players